Lisandro Fiks (born in Buenos Aires on 15 October 1971), is an Argentine director, actor, playwright and musician.

Among his plays are: 1982, Obertura solemne, 25 millones de argentinos, Un enemigo del pueblo, Extra virgen, Mala Praxis and Hombres y ratones.

For fourteen years he was part of the musical-theatrical group Los Amados.

Fiks mainly studied acting with Augusto Fernandes for twelve years (2007-2018) and directing for 9 years (2009-2017). Additional studies with Julio Chávez; Beatriz Spelzini; Berta Goldenberg and Silvia Kanter.

Theatre 

Plays in which he participated:
Extra Virgen (Playwright, Composer, Stage Director, Director)
Hombres y ratones (Adaptation, Lightning Design, Actor, Director)
Un enemigo del pueblo (Adaptation, Translation, Composer, Director)
Camuflaje! (Actor)
Leia (Actor)
El avaro (Actor)
25 millones de argentinos (Playwright, Lightning Design, Actor, Director)
1938. Un asunto criminal (Artistic Collaboration, Voice in off)
El toque de un poeta (Actor)
Mala Praxis (Playwright, Actor, Director)
Arizona (Actor)
1982, Obertura solemne (Playwright, Actor, Director)
Los Amados: El danzón (Musician, musical director)
Dos (una obra despareja) (Actor)
Los Amados, románticos y enamorados (Performer, musical director)
Los Amados y la Orquesta de la UBA: Homenaje a la música latinoamericana (Musician, musical director)
Rutilantes (musical director)
Karabali, ensueño Lecuona (Musician, Musical Arrangements, musical director)
Panama´s Affaire (Musician, musical director)

Movie appearances 
Fiks appeared on the big screen or collaborated in:
La ira de Dios
The Two Popes
La Noche de 12 Años
Lala, Composer

TV appearances 
On TV he appeared in, among others:
Argentina, tierra de amor y venganza
Soy Luna
Guapas

Awards 
Among the numerous awards, which Fiks received, the most important distinctions were in 2017 and in 2015, when the honorable Senate of Argentina declared his plays of Cultural Interest:
25 millones de Argentinos
1982, Obertura solemne

7 wins out of 15 nominations

Shared Awards 
The following Awards are shared with all of the members of Los Amados (2003–2012).

6 wins out of 7 nominations

Discography

Books 
"Un enemigo del pueblo" Ibsen/Fiks, Colección "Reescrituras argentinas" Editorial Los libros del espectador. Con el auspicio de la Real Embajada de Noruega. ISBN 978-987-48040-0-6
MALVINAS II, "1982 obertura solemne" Colección Dramaturgia Argentina, Ediciones del CCC, ISBN 978-987-3920-52-3

References 

Honorable Senado de la Nación Argentina
Honorable Senado de la Nación Argentina
Miserias humanas y fanatismo político
Puro Ibsen: Un enemigo del pueblo, potente clásico en su versión original
Hombres y ratones: la opresión que mata sueños
1982, obertura solemne
Críticas de teatro
Entrevista a Lisandro Fiks por '1982 Obertura Solemne' ⋆ Moviementarios
Mano a mano con Lisandro Fiks, uno de los mejores autores argentinos
La mentira original
Mala Praxis, de Lisandro Fiks
Una relectura de los años 70 en clave de humor negro
SE ENTREGARON LOS PREMIOS TRINIDAD GUEVARA

“Un enemigo del pueblo” recibe el premio José María Vilches 2019
Lisandro Fiks y el debut de Hombres y Ratones: “Me fascinó adaptar el texto de John Steinbeck”
Aceite Extravirgen bien prensado
Lisandro Fiks: “El secreto está en hacer hincapié en lo profundo de los vínculos”
Lisandro Fiks trae “1982 obertura solemne”
Attaque 77 - Triángulo De Fuerza (El Álbum)
Todos los nominados de los Premios Gardel 2012

Página/12 :: Espectáculos :: El mejor teatro de temporada
Eva, la gran ganadora de los premios ACE
Attaque 77 se despide de su ciclo de acústicos en el ND Teatro
Arizona de Juan Carlos Rubio
Extra Virgen de Lisandro Fiks, Juan Leyrado
Hombres y ratones de John Steinbeck
Un enemigo del pueblo de Henrik Ibsen
Camuflaje!
Leia
El avaro de Molière
25 millones de argentinos
1938. Un asunto criminal de Augusto Fernandes
El toque de un poeta de Eugene O´neill
1982, Obertura solemne de Lisandro Fiks
Los Amados: El danzón
Los Amados, románticos y enamorados
los amados y la orquesta en Alternativa. Comunidad en escena.
Rutilantes
Karabali, ensueño Lecuona
Panama´s Affaire de Helena Tritek
Fiks, Lisandro

External links 
Lisandro Fiks at Alternativa Teatral
Lisandro Fiks at IMDb
Lisandro Fiks on Instagram
Publication of the play Un Enemigo del Pueblo in the version of Lisandro Fiks
Lisandro Fiks on YouTube

1971 births
Living people
Argentine theatre directors
Male actors from Buenos Aires
Musicians from Buenos Aires
Argentine dramatists and playwrights
Argentine male television actors
21st-century Argentine male writers
Argentine male stage actors
20th-century Argentine male writers
21st-century Argentine male actors
21st-century Argentine male musicians
20th-century Argentine male actors
20th-century Argentine male musicians